The 1997–98 Bundesliga was the 35th season of the Bundesliga, Germany's premier football league. It began on 1 August 1997 and ended on 9 May 1998. FC Bayern Munich were the defending champions. FC Kaiserslautern won the Bundesliga on 1 May 1998 with one match remaining, the only time to date that a newly promoted team has won the league.

Competition modus
Every team played two games against each other team, one at home and one away. Teams received three points for a win and one point for a draw. If two or more teams were tied on points, places were determined by goal difference and, if still tied, by goals scored. The team with the most points were crowned champions while the three teams with the fewest points were relegated to 2. Bundesliga.

Team changes to 1996–97
Fortuna Düsseldorf, SC Freiburg and FC St. Pauli were relegated to the 2. Bundesliga after finishing in the last three places. They were replaced by 1. FC Kaiserslautern, VfL Wolfsburg and Hertha BSC.

Season overview
The 1997–98 Bundesliga battle for the championship was fought between FC Bayern Munich and 1. FC Kaiserslautern. Bayern were the defending champions after having won their 14th German title (their 13th Bundesliga title) in the 1996–97 season while Kaiserslautern were re-promoted to the Bundesliga; they had won the 1996–97 2. Bundesliga season with a ten-point margin after their first Bundesliga relegation at the end of the 1995–96 season. Kaiserslautern was coached by Otto Rehhagel who had been sacked as Bayern coach in the spring of 1996.

Coincidentally, the fixture table was such that both clubs met directly at the first match day. At Munich Olympic Stadium, Kaiserslautern achieved a surprising 1–0 away win. After another win (1–0 against Hertha BSC) they were at the top of the league table after matchday two. They regained this top position after matchday four and eventually stayed there until the end of the season. After the end of the first half of the season, Kaiserslautern was four points ahead of Bayern, and while it was expected by many that the second direct encounter at Fritz-Walter-Stadion would be the start of an eventual change at the top, FCK again beat Bayern, this time 2–0, resulting in a seven-point margin between the two teams after matchday 18. Remarkable matchdays in terms of who would win the championship included round 23 and 24, when Bayern lost two matches in a row, while FCK managed to collect four points. Bayern never overtook Kaiserslautern during the whole season, and after matchday 33, with FCK beating VfL Wolfsburg 4–0 at home while Bayern only achieving a 0–0 draw at MSV Duisburg, Kaiserslautern were the early champions, with four points ahead with only one match remaining. They were the first team in Bundesliga history to win the championship as a newly promoted team.

Another surprise of the season was FC Hansa Rostock who just missed qualification for the UEFA Cup, and all three newly promoted teams avoided relegation. At the bottom of the table, Arminia Bielefeld was the first team to be relegated, while 1. FC Köln had to go down after a 2–2 draw against Bayer Leverkusen in the final match of the season, ending a consecutive 35-year run of Bundesliga seasons for Cologne and leaving Hamburger SV as the "dinosaur" of the league (that is, the only Bundesliga founding member that had never been relegated until 2018). Karlsruher SC left the league after eleven seasons, while Borussia Mönchengladbach escaped relegation on the last matchday.

Team overview

League table

Results

Top goalscorers

Champion squad

See also
 1997–98 2. Bundesliga
 1997–98 DFB-Pokal

References

External links
 DFB Bundesliga archive 1997/1998

Bundesliga seasons
1
Germany